Abyss Pool is a hot spring in the West Thumb Geyser Basin of Yellowstone National Park in the United States.

History 
The pool was named by Chief Park Naturalist Clyde M. Bauer, possibly after a reference to Lieutenant G.C. Doane's 1870 description of a spring in this area which spoke of the visibility of objects in the "deep abysses" of the pool. A visitor in 1883 described it as "a great, pure, sparkling sapphire rippling with heat.".

Geology 
The pool erupted for the first time in recorded history between August 1987 and September 1991 and again between December 1991 and June 1992. Since 1992, the pool has returned to its non-eruptive state.

See also 
 List of Yellowstone geothermal features

References 

Geothermal features of Yellowstone National Park
Hot springs of Wyoming
Geothermal features of Teton County, Wyoming
Hot springs of Teton County, Wyoming